The Union of Kodak Workers was a trade union in the United Kingdom. It affiliated with the Transport and General Workers' Union in 1974.

References
Arthur Ivor Marsh, Victoria Ryan. Historical Directory of Trade Unions, Volume 5 Ashgate Publishing, Ltd., Jan 1, 2006 pg. 437

See also
 List of trade unions
 Transport and General Workers' Union
 TGWU amalgamations

Defunct trade unions of the United Kingdom
Kodak
Transport and General Workers' Union amalgamations
Trade unions disestablished in 1974